Artistic Differences is the third one-off programme from the British pop group S Club 7. It first aires in 2000 and is produced for CBBC. In this TV special, the group look in danger when Bradley falls out with Paul over artistic differences and decides to join another band, while Rachel wants to leave the band and get married.

Cast

S Club 7
 Tina Barrett
 Paul Cattermole
 Jon Lee
 Bradley McIntosh
 Jo O'Meara
 Hannah Spearritt
 Rachel Stevens

Guest stars
 Linda Blair – Joni
 Riley Schmidt – Zach
 Holly Willoughby – Zoe

References

2000 British television series debuts
2000 British television series endings
BBC children's television shows
British music television shows
British musical television series
S Club 7 television series
Television shows set in Los Angeles